Peter Ward (born 18 July 1963) is a Canadian former swimmer. He competed in the men's 200 metre butterfly at the 1984 Summer Olympics.

References

External links
 

1963 births
Living people
Canadian male butterfly swimmers
Olympic swimmers of Canada
Swimmers at the 1984 Summer Olympics
Pan American Games competitors for Canada
Swimmers at the 1987 Pan American Games
Sportspeople from North York
Swimmers from Toronto